Crime Stories may refer to:

 Crime Stories (British TV series), a 2012 British crime drama television series
 Crime Stories (American TV program), a 1998–2010 American documentary crime television program
 Crime Stories: Khoj Apradhi Ki,  a 2021 Indian Hindi-language interactive crime thriller series
 Crime Stories, American title of the video game Martin Mystère: Operation Dorian Gray

See also 
 Crime Story (disambiguation)